Desulfoconvexum algidum is a psychrophilic, strictly anaerobic and sulfate-reducing bacterium from the genus of Desulfoconvexum which has been isolated from cold marine sediments from Smeerenburgfjorden in Norway.

References

External links 

Type strain of Desulfoconvexum algidum at BacDive -  the Bacterial Diversity Metadatabase

Desulfobacterales
Bacteria described in 2013
Psychrophiles